The men's singles wheelchair tennis competition at the 1996 Summer Paralympics in Atlanta from 16 August until 25 August.

The Netherlands' Ricky Molier defeated the United States' Stephen Welch in the final, 7–6, 6–2 to win the gold medal in men's singles wheelchair tennis at the 1996 Atlanta Paralympics. In the bronze medal match, Australia's David Hall defeated France's Laurent Giammartini.

The United States' Randy Snow was the reigning gold medalist, but competed in wheelchair basketball instead.

Draw

Key
 INV = Bipartite invitation
 IP = ITF place
 ALT = Alternate
 r = Retired
 w/o = Walkover

Finals

Top half

Section 1

Section 2

Bottom half

Section 1

Section 2

References 
 

Men's singles